The Historical Museum of Bosnia and Herzegovina is a museum in Sarajevo, Bosnia and Herzegovina.

It holds more than 400,000 historical artifacts. The museum was founded on 13 November 1945 and took its present name in 1993, having at one point been called the Museum of the Revolution of Bosnia and Herzegovina.

See also
List of museums in Bosnia and Herzegovina

References

External links

Museums in Sarajevo
History museums in Bosnia and Herzegovina